The Secretary of State of Delaware is the head of the Department of State of the U.S. state of Delaware. The Department is in charge of a wide variety of public and governmental services, and is divided into the following divisions:

Delaware Division of Libraries
Delaware Division of the Arts
Delaware Public Archives
Delaware State Banking Commissioner
Conference Centers(Buena Vista/Belmont Hall)
Division of Corporations(handles business records, including lien statements under the Uniform Commercial Code)
Government Information Center
Delaware Heritage Commission
Historical & Cultural Affairs
Human Relations
Merit Employee Relations Board
Notaries Public
Delaware Board of Pardons
Professional Regulation
Delaware Public Advocate
Public Employment Relations Board
Delaware Public Integrity Commission
Delaware Public Service Commission
Delaware Commission of Veterans Affairs
Delaware Veterans Home
Delaware Commission for Women

Some of the most important responsibilities of the Secretary of State involve registry of businesses and corporations, monitoring banks, and other commercial activities. However, unlike many other U.S. Secretaries of State, the Delaware Secretary of State is not in charge of administering elections in Delaware. The Delaware Department of Elections is a separate agency from the Department of State.

Secretaries of state (years served in office)

James Booth Sr. (1778–1799)
Abraham Ridgely (1799–1802)
William B. Shields (1802)
John Fisher (1802–1805, 1811–1812)
William Hazzard (1805)
Peter Robinson (1805–1808, 1814–1817, 1822–1823)
William Warner (1808)
Thomas Clayton (1808–1810)
John Barratt (1810–1811)
Willard Hall (1812–1814, 1821–1822)
Henry M. Ridgely (1817–1821, 1824–1826)
Henry H. Wells (1823–1824)
John M. Clayton (1826–1828)
Samuel Maxwell Harrington (1828–1830)
Caleb S. Layton (1830–1833, 1836)
James Rogers (1833–1835)
William Hemphill Jones (1835–1836)
John Brinkloe (1836)
Robert Frame (1836–1837)
Charles Marim (1837–1841)
John W. Houston (1841–1845)
John Wales (1845–1846)
George P. Fisher (1846–1847)
Daniel Moore Bates(1847–1851)
Alfred P. Robinson (1851–1855)
James R. Lofland (1855–1859)
Edward Ridgely (1859–1863)
Nathaniel B. Smithers (1863, 1895)
Samuel M. Harrington Jr. (1863–1865)
Custis W. Wright (1865–1871)
John H. Paynter (1871–1875)
Ignatius Cooper Grubb (1875–1879)
James L. Wolcott (1879–1883)
William R. Causey (1883–1887)
John P. Saulsbury (1887–1889)
John F. Saulsbury (1889–1891)
David T. Marvel (1891–1893)
John D. Hawkins (1893–1895)
J. Harvey Whiteman (1895–1897)
William H. Boyce (1897)
James H. Hughes (1897–1901)
Caleb R. Layton (1901–1905)
Joseph L. Cahall (1905–1909)
Daniel O. Hastings (1909)
William T. Smithers (1909–1911)
Charles S. Richards (1911–1913)
Thomas W. Miller (1913–1915)
George H. Hall ((1915–1917)
Everett C. Johnson (1917–1921)
Alden R. Benson (1921–1925)
William G. Taylor (1925)
Fannie S. Herrington (1925–1926)
Sylvester D. Townsend Jr. (1926–1927)
Charles H. Grantland (1927–1934)
Walter Dent Smith ((1934–1937)
Charles L. Terry Jr. (1937–1938)
Josiah Marvel Jr.(1938–1941)
Earle D. Willey (1941–1942)
William J. Storey (1942–1949)
Harris B. McDowell Jr. (1949–1953)
John N. McDowell (1953–1958)
George J. Schultz (1958–1961)
Elisha C. Dukes (1961–1969)
Eugene Bunting (1969–1971)
Walton H. Simpson (1971–1973)
Robert H. Reed (1973–1977)
Glenn C. Kenton (1977–1985)
Michael E. Harkins (1985–1991)
Michael Ratchford (1992)
William T. Quillen (1993–1994)
Edward J. Freel (1994–2001)
Harriet Smith Windsor (2001–2009)
Jeffrey W. Bullock (2009–present)

See also
 List of company registers

External links
Delaware Department of State Official Homepage
Explanation of the duties of each of the Department's divisions
History of the Delaware Department of State
 Delaware Division of Libraries
 Delaware Division of the Arts
 Delaware Public Archives
 Delaware State Banking Commissioner
 Conference Centers Buena Vista, Belmont Hall
 Division of Corporations (handles business records, including lien statements under the Uniform Commercial Code)
 Government Information Center
 Delaware Heritage Commission
 Historical & Cultural Affairs
 Human Relations
 Merit Employee Relations Board
 Notaries Public
 Delaware Board of Pardons
 Professional Regulation
 Delaware Public Advocate
 Public Employment Relations Board
 Delaware Public Integrity Commission
 Delaware Public Service Commission
 Delaware Commission of Veterans Affairs
 Delaware Veterans Home
 Delaware Commission for Women

State secretaries of state of the United States